AE Aquarii is a cataclysmic variable binary star of the DQ Herculis type. Because of its unique properties, this system has been subject to a number of scientific studies. The white dwarf in the AE Aquarii system is the first star of its type known to give off pulsar-like pulsations that are powered by its rotation and particle acceleration.

The AE Aquarii system consisting of an ordinary star in a close orbit around a magnetic white dwarf; the pair orbit each other with a period of 9.88 hours. The white dwarf primary has 63% of the Sun's mass but a radius of only about 1% of the Sun. As of 2009, it has the shortest known spin period of any white dwarf, completing a full revolution every 33.08 seconds. This spin is decreasing at a rate of  1.78 ns per year, which is unusually high. The secondary star has a stellar classification of K4-5 V, making it a main sequence star that is generating energy at its core through the thermonuclear fusion of hydrogen. It has about 37% of the Sun's mass but 79% of the Sun's radius.

This system displays flare activity that has been observed across multiple bands of the electromagnetic spectrum, including X-rays. Mass is being lost from the secondary star, most of which is being flung out of the system by the rapidly spinning magnetic primary.

See also
 Pulsar
 X-ray pulsar
 AR Scorpii − another white dwarf pulsar

References

External links
 Image AE Aquarii
  www.estadao.com.br

Aquarius (constellation)
Intermediate polars
101991
Astronomical X-ray sources
Aquarii, AE
White dwarfs
K-type main-sequence stars